Microsoft Visual InterDev, part of Microsoft Visual Studio 97 and 6.0, is an IDE used to create web applications using Microsoft Active Server Pages (ASP) technologies. It has code completion, database server management tools, and an integrated debugger.

The extensive InterDev IDE is shared with Microsoft Visual J++, and is the precursor to the Visual Studio .NET IDE. InterDev IDE can also be found in Microsoft Office 2000 as Microsoft Script Editor.

Visual Web Developer (integrated into Visual Studio) and Visual Web Developer Express have replaced InterDev in the Visual Studio suite of tools.

External links
 Microsoft Visual InterDev at MSDN.

Integrated development environments
Interdev
Discontinued Microsoft development tools